Ghost Train Orchestra is a Brooklyn-based jazz and chamber ensemble led by Brian Carpenter. The band formed in 2006 when an historic theater in Boston commissioned Carpenter as musical director for its 90th year celebration. For the commission, Carpenter transcribed and arranged a set of overlooked music from late 1920s Chicago and Harlem and formed a side project from his regular band Beat Circus to perform it. The following year the group started performing under the name Ghost Train Orchestra. The band first recorded in 2009 at Avatar Studios in Manhattan and released Hothouse Stomp in 2011 on Accurate Records.

The band's repertoire features Carpenter's rearrangements and often avant-garde treatments of obscure music from the 1920s and 1930s. Much of the source material has been culled from found 78s and rediscoveries by music historians and collectors such as Mitchell Kaba and Irwin Chusid.

Members
 Brian Carpenter – trumpet, harmonica, musical director
 Curtis Hasselbring – trombone
 Ron Caswell – tuba
 Andy Laster – alto saxophone
 Matt Bauder – tenor saxophone, clarinet
 Dennis Lichtman – clarinet
 Mazz Swift – violin, vocals
 Emily Bookwalter – viola
 Avi Bortnick – guitar
 Brandon Seabrook – guitar, banjo
 Michael Bates – double bass
 Rob Garcia – drums

Discography
 Hothouse Stomp (2011) - Music from late 1920s Chicago and Harlem
 Book of Rhapsodies (2013) - Carpenter's reimagining of chamber jazz from the late 1930s
 Hot Town (2015) - More music from late 1920s Chicago and Harlem, with guest Colin Stetson
 Book of Rhapsodies, Vol. II (2017) - More rearrangements of chamber jazz from the late 1930s for orchestra and choir

References

American jazz ensembles from New York City
Experimental big bands
Musical groups established in 2006
Musical groups from Brooklyn
Jazz musicians from New York (state)